Shallcross may refer to:

Shallcross, Durban, a suburb of Durban, South Africa
Shallcross, Derbyshire, UK
Shallcross (Anchorage, Kentucky), listed on the U.S. National Register of Historic Places
Shallcross (surname)